The Marksmen Quartet of Murrayville, Georgia originated in 1967 as a Southern gospel quartet under the direction of Dr. Earle Wheeler. Through the years, the group's styles moved to bluegrass gospel and country gospel.
Dove award nominees in 2008 for "God's Masterpiece" and 2010 for "Blue Ridge Mountain Memories," the group includes Earle Wheeler, Mark Wheeler, Darrin Chambers, Mark Autry and Davey Waller. 

The Marksmen Quartet joined producers Randall Franks and Alan Autry for the In the Heat of the Night cast CD “Christmas Time’s A Comin’” performing "Jingle Bells" with the cast on the CD released on Sonlite and MGM/UA for one of the most popular Christmas releases of 1991 and 1992 with Southern retailers. The group also provided background vocals for Anne Marie Johnson's performance of "Little Drummer Boy." Earle's wife Shirley painted the painting featured on the cover of the CD.

External links
http://marksmenquartet.com/.

American gospel musical groups
Gospel quartets
Musical groups established in 1967
Southern gospel performers